Richard Livingston Fuller (30 January 1913 – 3 May 1987)  was a West Indian cricketer from Jamaica who played in one Test in 1934–35.

Dickie Fuller was a burly all-rounder who batted in the lower order and bowled right-arm fast-medium with a slinging action. He made his first-class debut for Jamaica in two matches against the touring English team in March 1935. In the first match he was Jamaica's most successful bowler with four wickets, and in the second match, batting at number eight, he hit 113 not out, reaching his century in 130 minutes. He was included in the Test team for the match that began in Kingston a few days later, but his contribution to the West Indies' innings victory was negligible.

Fuller played English league cricket for Seaham Harbour in the Durham League in the early 1950s, and also played in Scotland. He then served as Government Sports Coach in Jamaica from 1956 to 1968.

References

External links
 
 Dickie Fuller at CricketArchive
 Portrait of Dickie Fuller at Getty Images

1913 births
1987 deaths
West Indies Test cricketers
Jamaican cricketers
Jamaica cricketers
People from Saint Ann Parish